Kevin Bobson (born 13 February 1980 in Amsterdam) is a Dutch retired professional football winger.

Club career 
Bobson was part of the famous Ajax Amsterdam youth academy. He scored his first goal for Ajax in a UEFA Cup tie against FK Dukla Banská Bystrica in September 1999. Bobson's chances were limited at Ajax, and he moved to NAC Breda in July 2001. He scored 10 goals in 70 games for NAC, and that prompted interest from RCD Espanyol of the Spanish La Liga to race for his signature. He only managed one goal for Espanyol (Goal number 3000 for Espanyol in Spanish La Liga) before moving back to the Netherlands to join Willem II in Tilburg in August 2004. He spent the 2007-08 season on loan with N.E.C. in Nijmegen. On 30 August 2008 he moved to FC Red Bull Salzburg, where he would be working again with manager Co Adriaanse, but could not break into the starting team and his contract was terminated on Bobson's initiative in January 2009. Following a stint at Luxembourg club FC Wiltz he had a trial with Excelsior but a move did not materialize.

Since then, he has moved into amateur football and played for Zuidoost United from 2012.

Personal life
Born in the Netherlands, Bobson is of Surinamese descent.

References

External links
  Bobson Scores goal number 3000 for RCD Espanyol

1980 births
Living people
Footballers from Amsterdam
Association football wingers
Dutch footballers
Dutch sportspeople of Surinamese descent
Eredivisie players
La Liga players
Austrian Football Bundesliga players
AFC Ajax players
NAC Breda players
RCD Espanyol footballers
Willem II (football club) players
NEC Nijmegen players
FC Red Bull Salzburg players
FC Wiltz 71 players
Dutch expatriate footballers
Dutch expatriate sportspeople in Spain
Dutch expatriate sportspeople in Austria
Dutch expatriate sportspeople in Luxembourg
Expatriate footballers in Spain
Expatriate footballers in Austria
Expatriate footballers in Luxembourg